The 2000 season of the Torneo Descentralizado was the 85th season of the top category of Peruvian football (soccer). It was played by 12 teams. The national champion was Universitario.

Competition modus 
The national championship was divided into two tournaments, the Torneo Apertura and the Torneo Clausura. Each was played on a home-and-away round-robin basis. The winners of each would play for the national title in a play-off, but since the same club had won both tournaments, it automatically won the national championship.

Following-season Copa Libertadores berths went to the champion, as well as to each of the half-year tournament's runners-up, who held a play-off as a formality to decide the overall season runners-up. The bottom team on the aggregate table was relegated, while the eleventh place team held a promotion play-off against the winner of the Segunda División (Second Division).

Teams 
Before the start of the season, Pesquero relocated from Chimbote to Huancayo and changed its name to Deportivo Wanka.

Torneo Apertura

Torneo Clausura

Final stages

Final 
No final for the championship title was contested after Universitario won both the Apertura and Clausura tournaments, thus automatically becoming national champions.

Second place play-off

Aggregate table

Promotion play-off 

Deportivo UPAO remained in Primera División Peruana

Top scorers 

37 goals
 Eduardo Esidio (Universitario)
19 goals
 Luis A. Bonnet (Cienciano)
15 goals
 Roberto Holsen (Alianza Lima)
13 goals
 James Angulo (Sport Boys)
12 goals
 Piero Alva (Universitario)
 Carlos Juárez (Sporting Cristal)
 Sergio Ibarra (Deportivo Wanka)

Notes

References

External links 
 Peru 2000 season Details on RSSSF

Peruvian Primera División seasons
Peru
Primera Division Peruana